Zalzalaa is a 2000 Maldivian horror classic film written and directed by Ahmed Nimal. Produced by Aslam Rasheed under Slam Studio, the film stars Ibrahim Wisan, Niuma Mohamed and Ali Shameel in pivotal roles.

Premise
Ahmed Zameel (Ibrahim Wisan) working at an office in Male' visits an island to handover his friend, Moosa's assets and cashes to his family after his shocking death. There he meets a happy-go-girl Shiuna Ibrahim (Niuma Mohamed) and a relationship grows between them. Zameel reveals that he has previously married to an indolent and irresponsible lady, Nashfa (Neena Saleem) and they are blessed with a son before he divorces her. Shiuna promises to love his son as her own and they marry. Things are going smoothly and happily until Ibrahim (Ali Shameel) arrives home and possess divergent attitude and behavior which is initially thought to be a mental disease, later revealed to be that he has been possessed by a spirit.

Cast 
 Ibrahim Wisan as Ahmed Zameel
 Niuma Mohamed as Shiuna Ibrahim
 Ali Shameel as Ibrahim
 Aishath Shiranee
 Neena Saleem as Nashfa
 Mifzal Amir as Shammi
 Nooma Ibrahim as Mariyam
 Mohamed Afrah as Shahid
 Chilhiya Moosa Manik as Mudhimbe
 Abdul Raheem as Nashfa's husband
 Ahmed Nimal as Adam
 Ahmed Shah as Zameel's friend

Soundtrack

References

2000 films
2000 horror films
Maldivian horror films
Films directed by Ahmed Nimal